Optimization Toolbox is an optimization software package developed by MathWorks.  It is an add-on product to MATLAB, and provides a library of solvers that can be used from the MATLAB environment.  The toolbox was first released for MATLAB in 1990.

Optimization algorithms 

Optimization Toolbox has algorithms for:
 Linear programming
 Mixed-integer linear programming
 Quadratic programming
 Nonlinear programming
 Linear least squares
 Nonlinear least squares
 Nonlinear equation solving
 Multi-objective optimization

Applications

Engineering Optimization 

Optimization Toolbox solvers are used for engineering applications in MATLAB, such as optimal control and optimal mechanical designs.

Parameter Estimation 

Optimization can help with fitting a model to data, where the goal is to identify the model parameters that minimize the difference between simulated and experimental data.  Common parameter estimation problems that are solved with Optimization Toolbox include estimating material parameters and estimating coefficients of ordinary differential equations.

Computational Finance 

Portfolio optimization, cashflow matching, and other computational finance problems are solved with Optimization Toolbox.

Utilities and Energy 

Optimization Toolbox solvers are used for security constrained optimal power flow and power systems analysis.

See also 

 Mathematical optimization

References

Further reading 
 

Mathematical optimization software